Bangladesh Standards and Testing Institution or BSTI is an autonomous government body under the Ministry of Industries constituted for the purpose of controlling the standards of services and goods, and  introduction of the international system of units of weights and measures in Bangladesh. This institution is a Key Performance Indicator (KPI) of the Government of Bangladesh.

History
Bangladesh Standards Institution (BDSI) was established in 1971 after the liberation war as a National Standards body of the country. In 1974, the institution so formed became member of the International Organization for Standardization (ISO). The present institution comes into being through an Ordinance (Ordinance XXXVII of 1985) with the merger of Bangladesh Standards Institution (BDSI) and the Central Testing Laboratories (CTL) in 1985. In 1995 Department of Agricultural Grading and Marking was merged with BSTI. The BSTI ordinance of 1985 was converted into an act in 2018.

About
BSTI formulates and issues Bangladesh Standards (BDS) for products and services inside the country. The products and services which maintain Bangladesh Standards are certified by the institution, and a Certification Mark (CM) licence is issued for a validity of three years after testing and verification of the quality of the products in its laboratories. Only the licensed manufacturers can use the BSTI certification mark in their product package. The institution has formulated over 4000 standards since its inception. 229 products require mandatory CM licence to be produced, distributed and sold inside Bangladesh.  

Metrology Division of the institution issues licences for package commodities to the manufacturers under Package Commodity Registration Rules 2021. It also calibrates and verifies the weighing and measuring devices used in the markets and ensures that they maintain the International System of Units.  

BSTI runs monitoring activities through surveillance, mobile courts, random sampling and testing from markets and factories. 

The institution provides laboratory testing facilities to organisations, government offices and individuals. It also provides metrology and instrument calibration services to local industries, markets, petrol pumps, oil tankers etc.

Governing Body
BSTI is an autonomous agency of the Government of Bangladesh. It operates its activities under the Bangladesh Standards & Testing Institution Act - 2018. A counsel of 37 members is the decision making body of the institution. Minister for the Ministry of Industries is the Chairperson of the counsel.

Wings 

 Certification Marks (CM) wing
 Metrology wing
 Physical Testing wing
 Chemical Testing wing
 Standards wing
 Administration wing
 Management System Certification wing

Membership
BSTI is member of following organisation: 
 International Organization for Standardization (ISO)
 International Organization of Legal Metrology (OIML)
 Codex Alimentarius Commission (CAC)
 International Electrotechnical Commission (IEC)
 Standards and Metrology Institute for Islamic Countries (SMIIC)
 Asia Pacific Metrology Programme (APMP)
 Asian Forum for Information Technology (AFIT)
 Standing Group for Standardization, Metrology, Testing and Quality

Offices
BSTI Head office is located in Dhaka. It has 11 other offices in the following regions:

 BSTI Divisional Office, Chittagong
 BSTI Divisional Office, Rajshahi
 BSTI Divisional Office, Khulna
 BSTI Divisional Office, Barisal
 BSTI Divisional Office, Sylhet
 BSTI Divisional Office, Rangpur
 BSTI Divisional Office, Mymensingh 
 Divisional Metrology Inspectorate, Dhaka
 BSTI Regional Office, Cumilla
 BSTI Regional Office, Faridpur
 BSTI Regional Office, Cox’s Bazar

References

External links
 
 

Standards organisations in Bangladesh
Organizations established in 1971
1971 establishments in Bangladesh
Government agencies of Bangladesh
Organisations based in Dhaka